Carl Pfaffmann (May 27, 1913 – April 16, 1994) was an American physiological psychologist,  noted for his research of the senses of smell and taste.

Pfaffman was a member of the National Academy of Sciences, the American Academy of Arts and Sciences, the American Philosophical Society, Florence Pirce Grant University Professor of Psychology at Brown University, Vincent and Brooke Astor Professor at Rockefeller University. He was a recipient of the Warren Medal from Society of Experimental Psychologists and the Distinguished Scientific Contribution Award from American Psychological Association.
He was also president of the Eastern Psychological Association and the Division of Experimental Psychology of the American Psychological Association.

Early life 
Pfaffmann was born in Brooklyn, New York, on May 27, 1913, and grew up in nearby Queens. His grandparents had emigrated from Germany He graduated from Brown University  in 1933, one of the youngest members of his class.

Chronology 
 1913 born in Manhattan
 1933 graduated from Brown University
 1935 became Rhodes Scholar
 1939 Ph.D. in physiology, Cambridge University
 1940-1965 faculty positions Brown University
 1952 professor of psychology
 1960 Florence Pirce Grant University Professor of Psychology
 1965 a professor and vice president, Rockefeller University
 1978 retires
 1980 named Vincent and Brooke Astor Professor

References 

1913 births
1994 deaths
20th-century American psychologists
Brown University faculty
Rockefeller University faculty
Brown University alumni
Alumni of the University of Cambridge
Fellows of the American Academy of Arts and Sciences
Members of the United States National Academy of Sciences
People from Queens, New York
Members of the American Philosophical Society